New Mexico State Road 128 (NM 128) is a  state road in the U.S. state of New Mexico. The route runs through the southeastern part of the state from NM 31 east of Loving in a southeasterly direction to Texas State Highway 128 (TX 128) at the Texas state line; it mainly passes through unpopulated semi-arid land, though it also serves the city of Jal. NM 28 is maintained by the New Mexico Department of Transportation (NMDOT).

Route description
NM 128 begins at a rural intersection with NM 31 in Eddy County. NM 31 continues west to U.S. Route 285 in Loving, which provides access to the larger city of Carlsbad; it also connects NM 128 to U.S. Route 62 and U.S. Route 180 to the north. From here, the road heads east through a semi-arid region dotted with potash mines. After passing south of the Waste Isolation Pilot Plant, the road turns to the southeast. It curves eastward again, crossing into Lea County and heading toward the city of Jal. In Jal, the road becomes known as Kansas Avenue and intersects NM 205 and NM 18. It leaves the city to the east, passing the general aviation Lea County Jal Airport and continuing through semi-arid rural land. The route ends at the Texas state line, where it continues eastward as TX 128.

Major intersections

References

External links

128
Transportation in Eddy County, New Mexico
Transportation in Lea County, New Mexico